The Delphian School is a co-ed K–12 private school operated by Delphi Schools. It uses L. Ron Hubbard's study techniques, known as Study Tech. It is located in unincorporated Yamhill County, Oregon, near Sheridan., with most students living on campus either full-time or five-day (going home for the weekends). The school also accepts day students; boarders must be at least eight years old, while day students can be as young as five.  Most of the school's 272 students are in grades 8-12.

Campus and history
In the fall of 1976, the Delphian School opened on the site of a former Jesuit novitiate near Sheridan, Oregon. The main building on campus is a four-story, Art Deco-style building with a brick exterior that was designed by Poole & McGonigle and built in 1933 for the Jesuit house.

An estimated 60 students were enrolled in the school's first year. Two years later in 1978 the school had 120 students; tuition was $4,500 for boarding students and $2,800 for non-boarders. In the mid-1980s the campus was considered as a possible location for a federal prison. The Sheridan Federal Correctional Institution opened in 1989 in another location in the area. 

The headquarters for Delphi Schools, Inc. are located at The Delphian School, which is the founding school.

During school closures due to COVID-19, the Delphian School offered free online classes.

Academics
The Delphian School is operated by Delphi Schools using L. Ron Hubbard's study techniques, known as Study Tech. The Study Tech teaching methodology is licensed through the Scientology-related group Applied Scholastics.  The school is also the location of Heron Books, which published textbooks and materials using Hubbard's educational philosophy (the Delphi Curriculum).

The school uses a proficiency- or competency-based education model. There are no letter grades, report cards, or traditional grade levels at the school. Students advance through the curriculum by demonstrating proficiency or competence rather than at a set time.

Delphian School is a member of the Oregon Federation of Independent Schools (OFIS), an organization that works to limit government influence on school choice.  The OFIS's current director, Mark Siegel, also acts as assistant headmaster of the school. The school is an accredited member of the Northwest Association of Independent Schools, and an accredited member school of AdvancED.

Activities

The Delphian School's sports team is known as the "Dragons". The school participates in the Oregon School Activities Association's (OSAA) Northwest League, 2A classification, for girls and boys sports: basketball, tennis, cross country, track and field, boys soccer, volleyball, and cheerleading; and for such other activities as speech and debate, solo music, and choir.

In 2014 the Delphian choir tied for the OSAA Choir State Championship. That year three school soccer players were named to the All-State team.

In 2013 a student was chosen as the youth delegate to Youth for Human Rights International, a Scientology-related organization.

Notable alumni
 Christine Anderson, farmer and winner of Distinguished Citizen award, farmer's rights advocate
 Sky Dayton, founder of EarthLink
 Philip Gale, computer prodigy, Internet software developer

References

External links

Private middle schools in Oregon
Sheridan, Oregon
Boarding schools in Oregon
Scientology-related schools
Educational institutions established in 1976
High schools in Yamhill County, Oregon
Buildings and structures in Yamhill County, Oregon
Private elementary schools in Oregon
Private high schools in Oregon
1976 establishments in Oregon